State assembly elections were held in Malaya from 20 May to 24 June 1959. The Alliance Party received over 50% of the vote in every state except Kelantan and Trengganu.

Results

Johore

Kedah

Kelantan

Malacca

Negri Sembilan

Pahang

Penang

Perak

Perlis

Selangor

Trengganu

References

State elections in Malaysia
State